Oliver Walter Frey (September 7, 1887 – August 26, 1939) was a Democratic member of the U.S. House of Representatives from Pennsylvania.

Biography
Frey was born near Quakertown, Pennsylvania. He moved to Ohio with his parents in 1891 and to Allentown, Pennsylvania, in 1893. He graduated from the College of William and Mary in Williamsburg, Virginia, in 1915. During the First World War he enlisted in the United States Army. He was commissioned a first lieutenant in the 314th Infantry, serving overseas in the 79th Division. He served from April 1917 until honorably discharged in June 1919. Frey resumed his studies at the University of Pennsylvania and graduated from its law department in 1920.

Frey was elected as a Democrat to the Seventy-third Congress to fill the vacancy caused by the death of Henry Winfield Watson. He was reelected to the Seventy-fourth and Seventy-fifth Congresses. He was an unsuccessful candidate for reelection in 1938. After his time in Congress he worked as general counsel for the Farm Credit Administration in Baltimore, Maryland, from April 1939 until his death in Allentown, Pennsylvania.

References

 Retrieved on 2009-02-24
Oliver Walter Frey entry at The Political Graveyard

External links

1887 births
1939 deaths
United States Army personnel of World War I
College of William & Mary alumni
People from Quakertown, Pennsylvania
Military personnel from Pennsylvania
United States Army officers
Democratic Party members of the United States House of Representatives from Pennsylvania
United States Army soldiers
University of Pennsylvania Law School alumni
20th-century American politicians